The Royal Oak Hotel was a public house and hotel in the market town of Poulton-le-Fylde, Lancashire. It stood on Breck Road at its junction with Station Road (formerly Breck Street). Built in 1842, it was, up until its demolition, the only hotel in the town. It replaced an earlier building, known as the Old Oak, which had also been a dye works.

Joseph Redshaw was the pub's first tenant in July 1843. It was during the time of Albany Featherstonehaugh's landlordship, in 1860, that the pub was renamed the Royal Oak Hotel. It was home to the local branch of the Inland Revenue and an excise office.

During its heyday, inquests and livestock sales were held at the pub.

It was named Chaplin's Bar between 2003 and 2009, at which point it closed.

The three-storey building was demolished in June 2018, after lying empty for several years. It was replaced by sixteen flats in 2022.

References 

Buildings and structures in Poulton-le-Fylde
Pubs in Lancashire
Hotels in Lancashire
2010s disestablishments in England

1842 establishments in England